Events in the year 1949 in Spain.

Incumbents
Caudillo: Francisco Franco

Births
June 15 - Albert Tarantola. (d. 2009)
November 2 - José Viejo. (d. 2014)

Deaths
January 14 - Joaquín Turina. (b. 1882)
February 18 - Niceto Alcalá-Zamora. (b. 1877)
June 25 - Alejandro Lerroux. (b. 1864)
Francesca Bonnemaison i Farriols. (b. 1872)

See also
List of Spanish films of the 1940s

References

 
Years of the 20th century in Spain
1940s in Spain
Spain
Spain